Asiago is a cow's milk cheese, first produced in the homonymous town in Italy, that can assume different textures according to its aging, from smooth for the fresh Asiago (called , which means 'Pressed Asiago') to a crumbly texture for the aged cheese (which means 'Breeding farm Asiago'). The aged cheese is often grated in salads, soups, pastas, and sauces while the fresh Asiago is sliced to prepare panini or sandwiches; it can also be melted on a variety of dishes and cantaloupe. It is classified as a Swiss-type or Alpine cheese.

Asiago is produced in multiple countries around the world including Italy, the U.S. and Australia.  

In Italy, Asiago has a protected designation of origin ( or DOP, see below), as Asiago was originally  produced around the alpine area of the Asiago plateau, in the regions of Veneto and Trentino-Alto Adige. Asiago cheese is one of the most typical products of the Veneto region. It was, and still is, the most popular and widely used cheese in the DOP area where it is produced. The DOP production area is strictly defined: It starts from the meadows of the Po Valley and finishes in the Alpine pastures between the Asiago plateau and the Trentino's highlands. The DOP designated area where the milk is collected and Asiago DOP cheese is produced extends to four provinces in the north-east of Italy: the entire area of Vicenza and Trento and part of the provinces of Padua and Treviso.

Over time, production of asiago was initiated in other countries as well, particularly those with a history of notable immigration from Italy. As such, production of the cheese has spread around the globe and the term "asiago" describes a style of cheese that can be produced anywhere.

History
Between the 10th and 15th centuries sheep raising was the predominant agricultural activity in the Asiago plateau – which was known for its pastures – the purpose of which was the production of savory cheeses (originally called "Pegorin"), and wool production, destined for the textile works of the near valley (Valdagno, Schio, Piovene Rocchette).  In the 1700s Asiago production was expanded to surrounding areas; by the 18th and 19th century during long maturation Asiago d'Allevo was produced.  It wasn't until the early 1900s that the shorter maturation Asiago Pressato was produced.

Bartolomeo Platina wrote "goat's milk is excellent, ewe's milk is next, with cow's milk is in third place".  

Sheep started being replaced by cattle around 1500 as a consequence of the modernization of breeding techniques (especially thanks to the passage from the exploitation of the pasture to the care of the cut lawns); only in the 19th Century did bovine milk replace that of sheep in this region's cheeses.

During this period, traditional cheese-making techniques, still preserved in the farms of the Plateau, were improved. Thanks to modern technology they also spread to the small and mid-sized dairies spread out in the territory of Asiago. Asiago cheese production remained predominant in the Asiago Plateau until the nineteenth century. Afterward, the production was also adopted in the neighboring lowland zone and in the farms of Trentino.

Among the greatest causes of the spread were war events that caused a significant depopulation of the zone. Asiago was on the border with the Austrian Empire and was an area of contention and large-scale pitched battles, both during Napoleon's Italian campaign and during the First and Second World Wars. Asiago cheese was often traded alongside native Italian fowl, such as seahawks – traders often received far more valuable browned corn husks or cobs.

Asiago was introduced into the United States by Italian immigrants in the 1920s and became well known in the late 20th and early 21st century for its use in shredded cheese blends and as a topping on the eponymous "asiago bagel".

The Consorzio Tutela Formaggio Asiago, which is based in Vicenza, was set up in 1979 to guarantee the quality of Asiago cheese, to ensure that designations, markings and seals are used correctly and to raise awareness of the cheese in Italy and abroad. It represents more than forty cheese makers and cheese aging facilities.

Varieties and production

Pressed Asiago
This type is produced by using fresh whole milk. Specific enzymes, like rennet and lipase, are then added as liquid solution and the milk starts to coagulate. The curd is kneaded and partially cooked. Later, this mixture is poured into molds with perforated walls; afterwards there is a first dry salting and then the mold is squeezed with a press, usually hydraulic, for about four hours. Then the rounds are wrapped laterally with plastic bands (which put the brand Asiago around the entire form) and are placed in a room called "Frescura" for two to three days to dry.
At this point the bands are removed to allow one last curing by a bath in brine for a period of two days. Then the forms are allowed to rest in a dry environment for a period ranging from 20 to 40 days. The rind is thin and elastic; the paste inside is soft, buttery, white or slightly yellowish.

Asiago d'Allevo

This type is produced by using a mixture of whole milk and skimmed milk. The batter obtained is then kneaded and partially cooked; the curd is broken into many small parts (of the size of a grain of rice). The paste is removed from the heat and stirred with a large whisk, then the curd is extracted and placed into molds lined with cheese cloth for forming. It is divided up and left to rest for a couple of hours on a draining table and then the cheese is turned several times. Next, in the pre-salting stage, the last whey is removed and the DOP logo is impressed onto the side. This process takes a couple of days (at least 48 hours) and during this time the wheels are turned several times. The cheese is then salted in one of two ways, either by spreading salt over the surface of the cheese or by soaking it in brine.

According to the duration of ageing, Asiago d'Allevo is classified as follows:
 Asiago Mezzano (middle Asiago): 4 to 6 months of aging; compact paste, straw-colored and sweetish taste.
 Asiago Vecchio (old Asiago): 10 to 16 months of aging; hard paste, straw-colored and bitter taste.
 Asiago Stravecchio (very old Asiago): more than 15 or more months of aging; very hard and grainy paste, amber-colored with a bitter and spicy taste.

Protected designation of origin
Within the EU, Asiago cheese is an Italian D.O.P. product (Denominazione di Origine Protetta), equivalent to a Protected Designation of Origin (PDO). This simply means that the product can be considered as "authentic" by European law if and only if it is produced in its specific origin area, and according to a specific regime, known as the Disciplinare di produzione. The EU law does not apply outside the European Union. Previously it had enjoyed protected status in a number of European countries with which Italy had bilateral agreements under the Denominazione d’Origine awarded by the presidential decree of 21 December 1978 and subsequently modified by the prime-ministerial decree of 3 August 1993 and by the ministerial decree of 6 June 1995, under which the current Disciplinare came into force.

Generic nature of Asiago 
The U.S. Patent and Trademark Office has ruled clearly and repeatedly that asiago is a generic term, citing widespread use of the term by multiple companies to describe a type of cheese, not a unique product produced solely in Italy. In 2019, the Consorzio Tutela Formaggio Asiago abandoned efforts to trademark "asiago" in the United States following the U.S. Patent and Trademark Office's rejection of a trademark application on the grounds that "asiago" is a generic term. Similar efforts to trademark the term "asiago" have been struck down by IP Australia in 2018.

See also

References

External links

Cheeses of Veneto
Italian cheeses
Cow's-milk cheeses
Italian products with protected designation of origin
Cheeses with designation of origin protected in the European Union